Jean Manga Onguéné (born 12 June 1946) is a former Cameroonian footballer who played as centre-forward. He is the 1980 African Footballer of the Year.

Club career
He spent his whole career at Canon Yaoundé in Cameroon.

International career
Manga Onguéné made several appearances for the senior Cameroon national football team, including in two Africa Cup of Nations in 1970 and 1972. Also in four FIFA World Cup qualifying matches.

In 2006, he was selected by CAF as one of the best 200 African football players of the last 50 years.

Honours

Club
 Cameroon Première Division: 1970, 1974, 1977, 1979, 1980, 1982
 Cameroon Cup: 1967, 1973, 1975, 1976, 1977, 1978
 African Cup of Champions Clubs: 1971, 1978, 1980
 African Cup Winners' Cup: 1979

Individual
 African Footballer of the Year: 1980

References

External links

Interview at CAFonline.com

1946 births
Living people
Association football forwards
Cameroonian footballers
Cameroon international footballers
Cameroonian football managers
Cameroon national football team managers
Canon Yaoundé players
African Footballer of the Year winners
1970 African Cup of Nations players
1972 African Cup of Nations players
1998 African Cup of Nations managers